Robin R. Bottin (born April 1, 1959) is an American special make-up effects creator. Known for his collaborations with directors John Carpenter, Paul Verhoeven and David Fincher, Bottin worked with Carpenter on both The Fog and The Thing, with Verhoeven on RoboCop, Total Recall and Basic Instinct, and with Fincher on Se7en and Fight Club. His many other film credits include The Howling, Legend, Innerspace and Fear and Loathing in Las Vegas.

Well respected in his field of prosthetic makeup (better known as special make-up effects), and described in 2013 as a "special effects genius", Bottin was nominated for an Oscar in 1986 for Best Makeup, and was awarded a Special Achievement Academy Award at the 1991 Academy Awards. He has two BAFTA nominations, and won two Saturn Awards with five further nominations.

Early life
Bottin was born in the Los Angeles suburb of El Monte, California. His father was a foreman for a van and storage company.

Career

From an early age Bottin enjoyed a steady stream of old horror films, as well as magazines like Famous Monsters of Filmland. At age 14, he submitted a series of illustrations to well-known special make-up effects artist Rick Baker, who promptly hired him. He worked with Baker on various films. Finally working on his own, his first big break was The Howling, where he was called to create an on-screen transformation from man to werewolf. Notably, Bottin's effect in The Howling appeared five months before his mentor Baker's similar scene in An American Werewolf in London. 

Bottin also worked on the Star Wars Cantina scene creatures. He was, in fact, the tallest player in the Cantina band.

After asking cinematographer Dean Cundey to introduce him to director John Carpenter, Bottin was hired by Carpenter to create the special makeup effects for his 1980 film The Fog.

In The Fog, Bottin provided the physical makeup effects, and had a small part in the film as Captain Blake. From there, Bottin's reputation grew when he again worked with Carpenter on Bottin's masterpiece effects in The Thing. Bottin worked on The Thing seven days a week (including late nights) for a year and five weeks straight, producing every creature effect (with the exception of the transformed dog, which was partially done by Stan Winston). According to the making of documentary on the DVD, the then 22 year-old's schedule was so punishing, and his attention to detail so precise, that after filming finished, he was hospitalised with exhaustion and pneumonia. 

Although his work was at first criticized for being too gruesome or distracting from the film's psychological themes, it has since been credited for actually enhancing the feel of the film. In one scene in which a character's head stretches off, Bottin decided to melt plastic. Little did he know that the melted plastic released explosive paint thinner so when the director decided to put flame under the camera lens the entire prosthetic exploded.

He later worked on the special make-up effects in Ridley Scott's Legend, which earned him an Academy Award nomination for Best Makeup.

Notably, Bottin designed and built Robocop's suit in Paul Verhoeven's RoboCop, and designed and built many striking special effects in Verhoeven's Total Recall, the latter of which earned Bottin a Special Achievement Academy Award.

Filmography
 King Kong (1976)
 Star Wars (1977)
 Piranha (1978)
 Rock 'n' Roll High School (1979)
 The Fog (1980)
 Humanoids From the Deep (1980)
 Tanya's Island (1980)
 The Howling (1981, also associate producer)
 The Thing (1982)
 Twilight Zone: The Movie (segment 3) (1983)
 Explorers (1985)
 Legend (1985)
 The Witches of Eastwick (1987)
 Innerspace (1987)
 RoboCop (1987)
 Total Recall (1990)
 RoboCop 2 (1990)
 Bugsy (1991)
 Basic Instinct (1992)
 RoboCop 3 (1993)
 Se7en (1995)
 Mission: Impossible (1996)
 Mimic (1997)
 Deep Rising (1998)
 Fear and Loathing in Las Vegas (1998)
 Fight Club (1999)
 Mr. Deeds (2002)
 Serving Sara (2002)
 Game of Thrones (2014)

References

External links
 

1959 births
Special Achievement Academy Award winners
American make-up artists
Living people
People from Greater Los Angeles
Special effects people
People from El Monte, California